Bula Atumba  is a town and municipality in Bengo Province, Angola.

References

Populated places in Bengo Province
Municipalities of Angola